Clarence Jordan (July 29, 1912 – October 29, 1969) was an American farmer and New Testament Greek scholar, was the founder of Koinonia Farm, a small but influential religious community in southwest Georgia and the author of the Cotton Patch paraphrase of the New Testament. He was also instrumental in the founding of Habitat for Humanity. His (2nd) cousin, Hamilton Jordan, served as White House Chief of Staff during the Jimmy Carter administration.

Life

Early years
Jordan was born in Talbotton, Georgia, as the seventh of ten children to James Weaver and Maude Josey Jordan, prominent citizens of that small town. From an early age the young Jordan was troubled by the racial and economic injustice that he perceived in his community. Hoping to improve the lot of sharecroppers through scientific farming techniques, Jordan enrolled in the University of Georgia, earning a degree in agriculture in 1933. During his college years, however, Jordan became convinced that the roots of poverty were spiritual as well as economic. This conviction led him to the Southern Baptist Theological Seminary in Louisville, Kentucky, from which he earned a Th.M. and a Ph.D. in the Greek New Testament in 1938. He was ordained as a Southern Baptist minister. While at seminary Jordan met Florence Kroeger, and the couple were soon married.

Koinonia Farm
In 1942, the Jordans and another couple, Martin and Mabel England, who had previously served as American Baptist missionaries, and their families moved to a 440-acre (1.8 km2) tract of land near Americus, Georgia, to create an interracial, Christian farming community. They called it Koinonia (κοινωνία), a word meaning communion or fellowship that in Acts 2:42 is applied to the earliest Christian community.

The Koinonia partners bound themselves to the equality of all persons, rejection of violence, ecological stewardship, and common ownership of possessions. For several years the residents of Koinonia lived in relative peace alongside their Sumter County neighbors. But as the Civil Rights Movement progressed, white citizens of the area increasingly perceived Koinonia as a threat. In the 1950s and early 1960s, Koinonia became the target of a stifling economic boycott and repeated violence, including several bombings. When Jordan sought help from President Eisenhower, the federal government refused to intervene, instead referring the matter to the governor of Georgia. The governor Marvin Griffin, a staunch supporter of racial segregation, responded by ordering the Georgia Bureau of Investigation to investigate Koinonia's partners and supporters for purported Communist ties.

Jordan chose not to participate in the marches and demonstrations of the era. He believed that the best way to effect change in society was by living, in community, a radically different life.

Koinonia Farm continues to operate as a working farm and intentional Christian community welcoming visitors and interns and operating various ministries as an alternative to materialism, militarism and racism.

Cotton Patch series
In the late 1960s, the hostilities gradually subsided, and Jordan increasingly turned his energies to speaking and writing. Among the latter are his well-known Cotton Patch series, homey translations of New Testament writings. Jordan believed it was necessary not only to translate individual words and phrases, but also the context of Scripture. Thus, Jordan retitled Paul's letter to the Ephesians "The Letter to the Christians in Birmingham." His translation of Ephesians 2:11-13 is typical:

Along with his rendering of "Jew and Gentile" as "white man and Negro," Jordan converted all references to "crucifixion" into references to "lynching," believing that no other term was adequate for conveying the sense of the event into a modern American idiom:

The Cotton Patch series used American analogies for places in the New Testament; Rome became Washington, D.C., Judaea became Georgia (the Governor of Judaea became the Governor of Georgia), Jerusalem became Atlanta, and Bethlehem became Gainesville, Georgia.

Jordan's translations of scripture portions led to the creation of a musical, Cotton Patch Gospel, telling the life of Jesus Christ using his style and set in Georgia, and incorporating some passages from his translations.

Habitat for Humanity

In 1965, Millard and Linda Fuller visited Koinonia, planning only to stay for a couple of hours. Inspired by Jordan, however, the Fullers chose to make Koinonia their permanent home in mid-1968. A marital crisis and dissatisfaction with their millionaire lifestyle had earlier persuaded the couple to sell their possessions and seek a life together in Christian service. The Fuller family brought renewed energy to Koinonia. The organization changed its name to Koinonia Partners and started a number of partnership type ventures such as "Partnership Housing," a project to build and sell quality, affordable homes at cost with a no interest mortgage for low-income area families. The Fullers' five years at Koinonia followed by three years of building "partnership housing" in the Democratic Republic of Congo (then known as Zaire or Belgian Congo) would eventually lead, in 1976, to the creation of Habitat for Humanity.

Jordan, however, would not live to see the completion of the first house. On October 29, 1969, he died suddenly of a heart attack. As he had requested, Clarence had a simple burial. His body was placed in a shipping crate from a local casket manufacturer and was buried in an unmarked grave on Koinonia property. Jordan's funeral was attended by his family, the Koinonia partners, and the poor of the community. Florence Jordan died at Koinonia in 1987 and was buried there. Jordan's papers are housed at the University Of Georgia. 

"He be gone now," reflected a neighbor in 1980, "but his footprint still here".

Published works

References

Further reading
 
 
 Marsh, Charles. The Beloved Community: How Faith Shapes Social Justice, from the Civil Rights Movement to Today (New York: Basic Books, 2004)

External links
Biography at KoinoniaFarm.org
The Cotton Patch Version of the New Testament
Briars in the Cotton Patch, documentary broadcast on PBS

1912 births
1969 deaths
Jordan Clarence
Translators of the Bible into English
University of Georgia alumni
People from Talbotton, Georgia
20th-century translators